Senator Bidwell may refer to:

Barnabas Bidwell (1763–1833), Massachusetts State Senate
Everett Bidwell (1899–1991), Wisconsin State Senate
John Bidwell (1819–1900), California State Senate

See also
Arthur J. Bidwill (1903–1985), Illinois State Senate